Trecina Evette "Tina" Campbell (née, Atkins; born May 1, 1974) is an American urban contemporary gospel, Christian R&B and contemporary R&B recording artist and musician. She started her music career in 1998 with her older sister, Erica Campbell, as part of the gospel music group, Mary Mary. Her solo music career began in 2014, and has since released one studio album with Gee Tree Creative, where it charted on the Billboard magazine chart. She released her second studio album, It's Still Personal on September 29, 2017.

Early life
Campbell was born Trecina Evette Atkins, on May 1, 1974, in Inglewood, California, the daughter of Edward Aaron Atkins, Jr. (1948–2013), originally from Merced, California, a pastor and minister, and Thomasina Andrea "Honey" Atkins (née, Daniels), who is originally from Stamford, Connecticut. Her paternal grandparents are Eddie Aaron Atkins, Sr. and Lavada Cruthird, and her maternal grandparents are Tommy and Ruth Daniels. She had two older brothers, Andre Lavelle Atkins, who died at six years old from a combination of Down Syndrome, spinal meningitis, and a hole in his heart, while her other brother is living in Arizona, Darrell Antoine Atkins. She has two older sisters, Maliea Dionne Atkins and Erica Monique Atkins, and four younger sisters, Delisa Marie "Lisa" or "Wittle Wees" Atkins, Thomasina Andrea "Goo Goo" Atkins, Alana Ellesse "Lainz" or "Luv Luv" Atkins, and Shanta Nena Lavea Atkins.

Music career
Her music career started in 1998, with her older sister, Erica Campbell, who formed half of the gospel music duo, Mary Mary. In 2008, Campbell recorded a solo track called "Don't Waste Your Time" for the soundtrack to the independent film A Good Man Is Hard to Find. She commenced her solo music recording career in 2014, by recording her first studio album, It's Personal, that released on May 21, 2015, with Gee Tree Creative. This album was her breakthrough release upon the Billboard magazine charts, while it charted on The Billboard 200, Top Gospel Albums, and Independent Albums charts, where it peaked at Nos. 90, 1, and 10, correspondingly.

Personal life
She is married to Teddy Campbell, with whom she resides in Los Angeles, California together, with their five children, Cierra, Laiah Simone, Meela Jane, Glendon Theodore Jr., and Santana.

Discography

Studio albums

Singles

Accolades

References

External links
 Official website

1974 births
Living people
African-American songwriters
African-American women singers
African-American Christians
Musicians from Inglewood, California
Songwriters from California
American gospel singers
20th-century American singers
Mary Mary
21st-century American women singers
21st-century American singers
20th-century American women singers